Kiss of Fire may refer to:
 "El Choclo", a 1903 song by Ángel Villoldo, also known by the English name "Kiss of Fire"
 "Kiss of Fire", a 2015 song from the album Underworld by Symphony X
 Kiss of Fire (film), a 1955 American movie directed by Joseph M. Newman and starring Jack Palance and Barbara Rush
 Goubbiah, mon amour, a 1956 French movie, known in the UK by the name Kiss of Fire
 Claudine's Return, a 1998 movie starring Christina Applegate which was released on DVD as Kiss of Fire